Sissel Marie Rønbeck (born 24 May 1950 in Hammerfest, Finnmark) is a Norwegian politician for the Labour Party.

Biography 
She was Minister of Administration and Consumer Affairs 1979–1981, Minister of Environmental Affairs 1986–1989, and Minister of Transport and Communications 1996–1997. Between 1981 and 1993 she was a parliamentary representative for Oslo in the Norwegian legislature, Storting. She is currently deputy director of the Norwegian Directorate for Cultural Heritage (Riksantikvaren), and a member of the Norwegian Nobel Committee.

Rønbeck attended Oslo Cathedral School, but did not complete her examen artium.

References

1950 births
Living people
Members of the Storting
Labour Party (Norway) politicians
Ministers of Climate and the Environment of Norway
Ministers of Transport and Communications of Norway
People educated at Oslo Cathedral School
People from Hammerfest
Women government ministers of Norway
20th-century Norwegian women politicians
20th-century Norwegian politicians
Women members of the Storting